Michael Charles Chilufya Sata (6 July 1937 – 28 October 2014) was a Zambian politician who was the fifth president of Zambia, from 23 September 2011 until his death on 28 October 2014. A social democrat, he led the Patriotic Front (PF), a major political party in Zambia. Under President Frederick Chiluba, Sata was a minister during the 1990s as part of the Movement for Multiparty Democracy (MMD) government. He went into opposition in 2001, forming the PF. As an opposition leader, Sata – popularly known as "King Cobra" – emerged as the leading opposition presidential contender and rival to President Levy Mwanawasa in the 2006 presidential election, but was defeated. Following Mwanawasa's death, Sata ran again and lost to President Rupiah Banda in 2008.

After ten years in opposition, Sata defeated Banda, the incumbent, to win the September 2011 presidential election with a plurality of the vote. He died in London on 28 October 2014, leaving Vice President Guy Scott as Acting President until a presidential by-election was held on 20 January 2015.

Early years
Michael Charles Chilufya Sata was born on 6 July 1937, and brought up in Mpika, Northern Province. He worked as a police officer, railway man and trade unionist during colonial rule. He spent time in London working on the railway sweeping the platforms. Among other things, he was a porter at Victoria railway station. Sata began actively participating in the politics of Northern Rhodesia in 1963. Following independence, he worked his way up through the rough-and-tumble rank-and-file of the ruling United National Independence Party (UNIP) to the governorship of Lusaka in 1985. As Governor, he made his mark as a man of action with a hands on approach. He cleaned up the streets, patched roadways and built bridges in the city. Afterward he became a member of parliament for Kabwata constituency in Lusaka. Though once close with President Kenneth Kaunda, he became disillusioned by Kaunda's dictatorial style and he left the UNIP to join the Movement for Multiparty Democracy (MMD) during the campaign for multi-party politics in 1991.

Personal life
Sata's first marriage was to Margaret Manda. He later married his second wife, Christine Kaseba, who became First Lady of Zambia during his presidency. Michael Sata reportedly had at least ten children between his two marriages.
 
In 2016, Sata's widow, Christine Kaseba, denied claims by another woman that she too had also been married to Michael Sata as well as herself.

Michael Sata has a Bachelor in Political Science from Atlantic International University.

Early politics
After Frederick Chiluba defeated Kaunda in 1991, Sata became one of Zambia's most instantly recognisable faces. Under the MMD, he served as minister for local government, labour and, briefly, health where, he stated that his "reforms brought sanity to the health system".

In 1995, he was appointed minister without portfolio, the party's national organising secretary during which his political style was described as "increasingly abrasive".

Formation of Patriotic Front
In 2001, President Chiluba nominated Levy Mwanawasa as the MMD's presidential candidate for the 2001 election. In frustration, Sata left the MMD and set up a new party, the Patriotic Front (PF). He contested the 2001 election but did not do well—his party only won one seat in parliament. Sata conceded defeat and continued to campaign

2006 election and afterwards
Sata contested the September 2006 presidential election as a populist championing the causes of the poor in the face of Mwanawasa's economic reform policies. While others on the slate of candidates contesting the election frequently resorted to personal attacks and insults, Sata's remarks were at times quite equally scathing. At one campaign event in particular, Sata was reported to have ripped apart a cabbage in front of his supporters. The cabbage was a reference to Mwanawasa's speech impediment, which was the result of an injury sustained in a 1992 car crash. He has also accused Mwanawasa of "selling out" Zambia to international interests, and at one event, he referred to Hong Kong as a country and Taiwan as a sovereign state. In response, China threatened to cut off relations with Zambia if he was elected. Sata's right-hand man in the campaign was Dr. Guy Scott, the Patriotic Front secretary general. Scott is a white Zambian politician. He served a number of ministerial positions during the Chiluba government. Sata also received the public backing of Chiluba.

Initial results from the election gave Sata the lead, but further results put Mwanawasa in first place and pushed Sata into third place. Interim results released after votes from 120 of 150 constituencies were counted put Mwanawasa on just over 42% of the vote; Hakainde Hichilema had 28%; and the Michael Sata had slipped to 27%. When opposition supporters heard that Sata had slipped from first to third place, riots erupted in Lusaka. On 2 October, the Zambian Electoral Commission announced that Mwanawasa had officially won the election; final results put Sata in second place with about 29% of the vote.

Sata was arrested in early December 2006, accused of making a false declaration of his assets when applying to run for president in August, along with other charges. He was questioned by police and released on bail. If convicted, he could have received a prison sentence of least two years. As a convict, he would also be unable to hold public office. Sata said the charges were politically motivated, and in court he pleaded not guilty to them. On 14 December, the charges were dropped on the grounds that the declaration of assets was not made under oath.

On 15 March 2007, Sata was deported from Malawi shortly after arrival. Sata said that he was only there to meet with the business community, and alleged that the Zambian government had effected the deportation by falsely claiming that Sata was in Malawi to assist that country's former president, Bakili Muluzi. The Zambian government denied this, while the Malawian government gave no explanation for Sata's deportation. On 6 April, Sata's lawyer said that he had initiated a lawsuit against the Malawian government for violating his rights.

After losing his passport in London in late 2007, Sata was issued another; however, on 10 November 2007, Minister of Home Affairs Ronnie Shikapwasha announced that Sata's passport was withdrawn temporarily because he had obtained the new passport without following the necessary procedures and proving that he needed a new passport. Shikapwasha said that an investigation would follow, that Sata had been interrogated, and that he could face arrest.

Sata suffered a heart attack on 25 April 2008 and was evacuated to Milpark Hospital in Johannesburg, South Africa, where he was said to be in stable condition on 26 April. He reconciled with President Mwanawasa in May 2008.

Mwanawasa's death and the 2008 election

After Mwanawasa suffered a stroke and was hospitalised in France, Sata questioned the official claims about Mwanawasa's health on 15 July 2008, and he called for a team of doctors to be sent by the Cabinet to examine Mwanawasa; this team would then disclose Mwanawasa's actual condition. Mwanawasa died in office in August 2008. On 25 August, Sata attempted to attend funeral proceedings for Mwanawasa at Chipata in Eastern Province; however, Maureen Mwanawasa, Mwanawasa's widow, ordered Sata to leave, saying that he was politicising the event and that he had never reconciled with Mwanawasa's family. Sata, who was removed from the scene by security, said that he was only there to mourn Mwanawasa and that he had hoped to escort the body while it was taken to provincial capitals across Zambia; he maintained that his reconciliation with Mwanawasa himself was sufficient to justify his presence. He also said that Maureen Mwanawasa had acted inappropriately.

Sata was unanimously chosen as the PF's candidate for the presidential by-election at a meeting of its Central Committee on 30 August 2008. Accepting the nomination, he expressed the need "to scrub this country and wash it"; he also said that he would refrain from campaigning until after Mwanawasa's funeral. Despite his April 2008 heart attack, Sata said that he was healthy and in good condition.

Sata said that he would not accept a victory for Banda because there was "no way MMD can win", and he alleged that the Electoral Commission and the police were working together to rig the election. Although he held the lead in early vote counting, which reflected his strong support in urban areas, his lead grew smaller as votes from rural areas were counted. In the end, Banda overtook Sata, and final results on 2 November showed Banda with 40% of the vote against 38% for Sata. Sata subsequently stated that he had not been defeated and accused Banda of fraud.

Presidency

Sata ran for President for a fourth time in the election held on 20 September 2011. In the early stages of the campaign he was more vitriolic in his anti-Chinese rhetoric, but he later toned down his rhetoric. Results showed him receiving about 43% of the vote against 36% for Banda, and Chief Justice Ernest Sakala accordingly declared that he had won the election in the early hours of 23 September. He was sworn in later in the day. He was said to have won because of the urban vote. Despite the toning down of his rhetoric, the investment climate in Zambia was considered uncertain in the wake of his victory.

Policies
On 8 September 2008, Sata claimed that he would protect Chinese investments if he was elected, abandoning the hostility towards Chinese investment that he had expressed during the 2006 presidential election campaign.

During the 2006 election campaign he was reported to have said of Zimbabwean President Robert Mugabe that "Mugabe hasn't done anything wrong. It is the imperialists, the capitalist-roaders, who say he is a villain."

In 2008, he said that he would revoke licenses for foreign investors if they resisted his orders to give at least a 25% stake in their companies to Zambians.

At his inauguration as President of Zambia, Sata assured foreign investors that they were welcome in his country, Africa's biggest copper producer, but said they must improve conditions for their Zambian employees.

Illness and death

Concerns about Sata's health grew during 2014 and some suggested that he was no longer really running the government due to his condition, although the government denied that. He stopped appearing in public, which seemed jarringly uncharacteristic for the notably extroverted and outspoken president. Observers thought he seemed unwell when he opened parliament on 19 September and over the course of the following month he failed to appear in public again. MMD leader Nevers Mumba alleged that the government was lying about Sata's health. He also missed a speech at the general debate of the sixty-ninth session of the United Nations General Assembly amid rumours he had fallen ill at a New York City hotel.

On 19 October, he left the country for what was described as a medical check-up, leaving Edgar Lungu, the Minister of Defense, in charge of the country in his absence. Given the circumstances, including the sudden nature of the trip, Sata's absence from public view and the fact that the 50th anniversary of Zambian independence was only days away, many believed that Sata was very seriously ill.

Sata died on 28 October in London. He was receiving treatment for an undisclosed illness. Cabinet Secretary Roland Msiska issued a statement that he died late in the day. "As you are aware the president was receiving medical attention in London. The head of state passed on October 28. President Sata's demise is deeply regretted. The nation will be kept informed on burial arrangements." When he died at 23:00 in King Edward VII Hospital, his wife, Christine Kaseba, son, Mulenga, and other family members were with him at the time. He is the second President of Zambia to die in office, after Levy Mwanawasa's death only six years earlier in 2008. Vice-President Guy Scott was named acting leader until an election, making him the first white leader of a democratically elected Sub-Saharan African government and the first since F. W. de Klerk in Apartheid South Africa.

Reactions

Domestic
Sata's predecessor, Rupiah Banda, said that Sata "was more than a public servant. He was a passionate competitor, a man of conviction and determination. He was also a loving son, a husband, a father, and friend to me, despite everything we've been through, a friend. Above all, Michael Sata was a Zambian, in body, soul, and spirit. We have gone through this before as a country and we made it to the other side because we were united. Let this be a time that we set aside the ideas that separate us, and embrace the humanity and dignity that unites us as a country and defines us as a people."

Mark Chona, former special assistant to Kenneth Kaunda, Zambia's first president, said: "We are very devastated because he was a very hard working and committed president and leader. He was extremely passionate about anything he had decided to achieve."

International
The South African government (which Vice President Scott had previously irritated by calling "backwards") issued a statement that read: "President Sata belongs to the generation of leaders produced by Zambia during the colonial times and gallantly pursued the anti-colonial struggle. His death reminds the people of South Africa of Zambia’s immeasurable sacrifice and the sterling leadership role that Zambia played in ridding the African continent of the yoke of colonial domination and apartheid rule."

Kenyan President Uhuru Kenyatta hailed Sata as an "outstanding son of Africa" and added: "He was gifted with unique, admirable abilities and strong values."

The Foreign Secretary of Zambia's former colonial power Britain, Philip Hammond, said: "[Sata] played a commanding role in the public life of his country over three decades...and finally as president."

References

External links
Presidency of Zambia (State House) Official Website
Patriotic Front website
Photo of Sata

Obituary in The Independent by Marcus Williamson
Sattaking

1937 births
2014 deaths
Members of the National Assembly of Zambia
Movement for Multi-Party Democracy politicians
Patriotic Front (Zambia) politicians
People from Mpika District
Presidents of Zambia
United National Independence Party politicians
Zambian trade unionists
Local government ministers of Zambia
Labour and Social Security ministers of Zambia
Health ministers of Zambia